Sørlandsruta AS is a Norwegian bus company that operates in Western Agder. It was founded in 1951 in a merger of 13 companies. The company has about 100 employees and operates on contract with Vest-Agder Kollektivtrafikk with base in Mandal. The most important route is Kristiansand - Mandal - Farsund - Flekkefjord that operates on a half-hour headway. The company is owned by the holding company Torghatten ASA who also owns Widerøe, Bastø Fosen, Norgesbuss, Trønderbilene and many more companies.

References

Torghatten ASA
Bus companies of Agder
1951 establishments in Norway
Transport companies established in 1951